The following is a list of notable Deerfield Academy alumni, sorted chronologically. See also :Category:Deerfield Academy alumni.

Pre-1900
 George Grennell, Jr. (1786–1877), U.S. Congressman from Massachusetts
 Edward Hitchcock (1793–1864), president of Amherst College
 John Williams (1817–1899), Presiding Bishop of the Episcopal Church
 George Sheldon (1818–1916), politician and historian
 Mary Tenney Castle (1819-1907), missionary and philanthropist in Hawaii
 Rufus Saxton (1824–1908), Union Army Brigadier General awarded Medal of Honor
 William Lincoln Higgins (1867–1957), U.S. Congressman from Connecticut

Classes of the 1920s
 Paul Langdon Ward (1911–2005), president of Sarah Lawrence College
 J. B. Jackson (1909–1996), writer, publisher, instructor, and sketch artist in landscape design.

Classes of the 1930s
 Budd Schulberg (1914–2009), screenwriter and novelist
 Hastings Keith (1915–2005), U.S. Representative from Massachusetts
 Douglas Kennedy (1915-1973), actor
 Lyman Kirkpatrick (1916–1995), inspector general and executive director of the Central Intelligence Agency
 H. Stuart Hughes (1916–1999), academic and activist
 Edwin W. Martin (1917–1991), U.S. Ambassador to Burma
 John Edward Sawyer (1917–1995), president of Williams College
 Robert Morgenthau (1919-2019), Manhattan district attorney
 James Colgate Cleveland (1920–1995), U.S. Congressman from New Hampshire
 Thomas Hedley Reynolds (1920-2009), President of Bates College
 William Zinsser (born 1922), writer
 Gordon MacRae (1921–1986), singer and actor
 Ian Barbour (1923-2013), Templeton Prize winner
 Charles Merrill Jr. (born 1920), writer, teacher and philanthropist
 John Mecklin (1918-1971), writer and journalist

Classes of the 1940s
 Talcott Williams Seelye (1922–2006), U.S. Ambassador to Syria and Libya
 John Chafee (1922–1999), U.S. Senator from and Governor of Rhode Island; Secretary of the Navy under President Richard Nixon
 David S. Dodge (1922 – January 20, 2009), vice-president for administration (1979–83), acting president (1981–82) and president (1996–97) of the American University in Beirut
 Thomas Keating (1923–2018), monk
 Arthur Nims (born 1923), Chief Judge of United States Tax Court
 Charles Clapp (1923-2004), Judge of United States Tax Court
 Dickinson R. Debevoise (born 1924), District Judge on the United States District Court for the District of New Jersey
 John Weinberg (1925–2006), chairman of Goldman Sachs
 Ogden R. Reid (1925-2019), U.S. Congressman from New York, U.S. Ambassador to Israel
 Henry W. Kendall (1926–1999), physicist, 1990 Nobel Prize recipient
 Daniel C. Searle (1926-2007), heir, CEO of G. D. Searle & Company, conservative philanthropist
 John Ashbery (1927–2017), poet
 James Wadsworth Symington (born 1927), U.S. Congressman from Missouri
 Carl Richard Woese (1928-2012), biologist, discovered archeabacteria
 Allen Stack (1928–1999), Gold Medalist U.S. swimmer at the 1948 Summer Olympics in London
 John Gunther, Jr. (1929–1947), son of author John Gunther and focus of his book Death Be Not Proud
 Gilbert Melville Grosvenor (born 1931), President of the National Geographic Society, 2004 Presidential Medal of Freedom
 John McPhee (born 1931), nonfiction writer, wrote The Headmaster, regular contributor to The New Yorker
 Hoddy Hildreth (born 1931), member of the Maine House of Representatives and conservationist; son of Governor of Maine Horace Hildreth

Classes of the 1950s
 Rodman Rockefeller (1932–2000), philanthropist
 Edward Hoagland (born 1932), writer
 Richard Mellon Scaife (1932-2014), media mogul and philanthropist, "The Republican George Soros"
 Nelson Doubleday, Jr. (born 1933), former owner of the publishing house Doubleday and the New York Mets
 Robert Hazard Edwards (born 1934), president of Carleton College; president of Bowdoin College
 Thomas C. Reed (born 1934), Secretary of the Air Force
 Warren Zimmermann (1934–2004), final U.S. Ambassador to Yugoslavia
 James M. Banner Jr. (born 1935), historian
 Steven C. Rockefeller (born 1936), philanthropist
 Frederick Louis "Fritz" Maytag III (born 1937), former owner of Anchor Brewing Company
 Kit Bond (born 1939), U.S. Senator from and Governor of Missouri
 Eric Widmer (born 1939), headmaster of Deerfield Academy; headmaster of King's Academy
 David H. Koch (born 1940), billionaire, Libertarian Vice-Presidential candidate in 1984
 David Childs (born 1941), architect

Classes of the 1960s
 Don Abbey, real estate businessman
 Bruce Faulkner Caputo (born 1943), U.S. Congressman from New York
 Robert Beavers (born 1949), experimental filmmaker
 Pete Varney (born 1949), Major League Baseball player
 Stephen G. Smith (born 1949), journalist
 Steven Brill (born 1950), journalist and publisher
 Edwin S. Grosvenor (born 1951), editor and publisher
 Peter Gabel (born 1947), law academic and associate editor of Tikkun, son of actors Arlene Francis and Martin Gabel
 Howie Carr (born 1952), journalist and radio host

Classes of the 1970s
 Stephen Hannock (born 1951), painter
 Jeffrey Bewkes (born 1953), CEO of Time Warner
 Nigel Newton (born 1955), publisher, founder of Bloomsbury Publishing
 Kerry Emanuel (born 1955), scholar
 Buddy Teevens (born 1956), Head Football Coach at Dartmouth College
 Ken Bentsen, Jr. (born 1959), U.S. Congressman from Texas
 Prince Alexander-Georg von Auersperg (born 1959), son of Sunny von Bulow and a member of the aristocratic principality of Auersperg
 Haun Saussy (born 1960), scholar

Classes of the 1980s
 King Abdullah II al-Hussein of Jordan (born 1962)
 Robert M. McDowell (born 1963), commissioner at the Federal Communications Commission from 2006 to 2013
 Matthew Fox (born 1966), actor
 Mark Rockefeller (born 1967), philanthropist
 Mike Trombley (born 1967), Major League Baseball player
 Nestor Carbonell (born 1967), actor
 Craig Janney (born 1967), NHL player
 Chris Waddell (born 1968), gold medalist Paralympic skier
 Matt Scannell, lead vocalist and founding member of Vertical Horizon
 Ted Ullyot, former Facebook general counsel, partner at Andreessen Horowitz
 Adam S. Weinberg (born 1965), president of Denison University in Granville, Ohio
 Milton Sands III (born c. 1969), admiral in the United States Navy

Classes of the 1990s
 Chris Klug (born 1972), Bronze Medalist U.S. snowboarder at the 2002 Winter Olympics in Salt Lake City, Utah
 Michael Sucsy (born 1973), acclaimed filmmaker, Grey Gardens
 Prince Hussain Aga Khan (born 1974), photographer and second son of Aga Khan IV
 Prince Ali bin Hussein (born 1975), Jordanian royal and Vice President of FIFA; attended for a year without graduating, made honorary graduate of the Class of 2006
 Marty Reasoner (born 1977), retired National Hockey League center
 Randal Williams (born 1978), National Football League player
 Peter Cambor (born 1978), actor
 Adriana Cisneros (born 1979), media mogul
 Jamie Hagerman (born 1981), bronze medalist, U.S. women's hockey, player at the 2006 Winter Olympics in Turin
 Jay Newton-Small, Bloomberg News and Time magazine reporter covering the White House and US politics; CEO and co-founder of MemoryWell
Chase Coleman III, class of 1993, investor and founder of Tiger Global Management
Bom Kim, class of 1996, Korean-American Billionaire and founder of Coupang
Hannah Pittard, class of 1997, American novelist

Classes of the 2000s
 David Branson Smith (born 1984), award-winning screenwriter of Ingrid Goes West and Adrift
 Ben Lovejoy (born 1984), retired ice hockey defenseman in the National Hockey League
 Ty McCormick (born 1987), award-winning foreign correspondent 
 Molly Schaus (born 1988), U.S. women's hockey player at the 2010 Winter Olympics in Vancouver
 Paul Johnson Calderon, television personality and fashion journalist
 Alex Killorn (born 1988), professional ice hockey forward for the Tampa Bay Lightning of the National Hockey League
 Willy Workman (born 1990), American-Israeli basketball player for Hapoel Jerusalem in the Israeli Basketball Premier League

Classes of the 2010s
 Osama Khalifa, squash player, winner of 2017 Squash National Championship
 Kevin Roy, professional ice hockey forward for the Anaheim Ducks of the National Hockey League
 Liam Holowesko, professional cyclist
 Sam Lafferty, professional ice hockey forward for the Pittsburgh Penguins of the National Hockey League
 Hunter Long, professional football tight end for the Miami Dolphins
 Jacob Lee (born 1994), singer songwriter The Voice
 Brandon Wu, professional golfer on the PGA Tour

References

Deerfield